Aldisa binotata is a species of sea slug, a dorid nudibranch, a marine gastropod mollusk in the family Cadlinidae.

Distribution
This species was described from Fédala, Morocco, .

References

Cadlinidae
Gastropods described in 1953